Thomas Norman Brooks (August 23, 1924 – September 23, 1992) was an American farmer and Democratic politician. He was a member of the Mississippi Legislature almost continuously from 1952 to 1985, when he was convicted and jailed for influence peddling. He also was the president pro tempore of the Mississippi State Senate from 1984 to his incarceration.

Biography 
Thomas Norman Brooks was born on August 23, 1924, in Walnut Grove, Mississippi. He graduated from Freeny High School and Millsaps College. He fought in the U. S. Army in World War II and received a Purple Heart. He represented Leake County in the Mississippi House of Representatives from 1952 to 1960. He then became a member of the Mississippi State Senate, representing the 17th district in the 1960–1964 term. He returned to the Senate in 1968, and served until 1985. In 1984, he became the president pro tempore of the Mississippi State Senate. However, in 1985, he was convicted for influence peddling, and spent  years in a minimum-security prison in Alabama. He died on September 23, 1992, in Freeny, Leake County, Mississippi.

References 

1924 births
1992 deaths
People from Leake County, Mississippi
Mississippi state senators
Members of the Mississippi House of Representatives
Presidents pro tempore of the Mississippi State Senate
American politicians convicted of corruption